is a Japanese football player. He plays for Vanraure Hachinohe.

Playing career
Yusei Okada joined to Tochigi Uva FC in 2010. In 2013, he moved to Grulla Morioka. In 2016, he moved to Vanraure Hachinohe.

References

External links

1987 births
Living people
Fukuoka University alumni
Association football people from Kumamoto Prefecture
Japanese footballers
J3 League players
Japan Football League players
Tochigi City FC players
Iwate Grulla Morioka players
Vanraure Hachinohe players
Association football defenders